Takir (takyr) (originally from Kazakh or another Turkic language) meaning "smooth, even, or bare", is a type of relief occurring in the deserts of Central Asia, similar to a salt flat in the southwestern United States.  A takyr is usually formed in a shallow depressed area with a heavy clay soil, which is submerged by water after seasonal rains. After the water evaporates, a dried crust with fissures forms on the surface. The crust is often colonized by filamentous cyanobacteria.

In the southwestern U.S. "takyrs" are known as "playas" or "salt flats", in Arab countries as "sabkha".

See also
Daryalyktakyr

References 
  Jayne Belnap, Otto Ludwig Lange. "Biological Soil Crusts: Structure, Function, and Management". Springer, 2001, . Page 90, Chapter 7.5, "Central Asia Takyr".
 Gerasimov I.P. On “takhirs” and the process of takyr formation: (Materials for the knowledge of the desert-steppe soil-forming process) in Soil Science. 1931. No. 4. S. 5-13.
 Gerasimov I.P. On "takhirs", their genetic essence and the process of takyproerazovaniya // Soil Science. 1933. No. 5. P. 401-403.
 Uspanov, U. U., Genesis and Reclamation of takyr. M .; L .: Publishing House of the Academy of Sciences of the USSR, 1940. 116 p. (Works of the Soil Institute; T. 19. Issue 1).
 Gvozdetsky N. A., Mikhailov N. I. Takyry: Deserts of the Turan Lowland and Balkhash in Physical Geography of the USSR. Asian part. Third edition, revised and updated. Moscow. Thought. 1978
 "Kyrgyzstan" National Encyclopedia , Volume: 6. Asanov, chief editor of Y. A. K 97. K .: State and the Center, 2014. 816 pages, Fig. 

Salt flats